Marvin Camel (born December 24, 1951) is a retired boxer and member of the Confederated Salish and Kootenai Tribes of the Flathead Indian Reservation in Northwestern Montana. He was born in Ronan and fought out of Missoula. He was the first person recognized as the cruiserweight boxing champion of the world by two different professional sanctioning bodies.

Professional boxing career
Camel fought Mate Parlov in Yugoslavia to a draw in the first ever cruiserweight world title bout. In the rematch, in Las Vegas, Camel beat Mate Parlov for the vacant WBC world Cruiserweight title in 1980, losing the title in his first defense, to Carlos De León who replaced David Pearce. After losing in a rematch to De Leon, he became, in 1983, the IBF's first world champion, by beating Roddy McDonald who also replaced David Pearce after the BBBoC would not sanction the Cruiserweight division in the UK) and thus becoming world Cruiserweight champion for the second time when he claimed that organization's title. He later lost the title to Lee Roy Murphy.

He lost his final bout in June 1990 against Eddie “Young Joe Louis” Taylor in Minneapolis. The 10-round decision left his lifetime mark at 45-13-5.

Camel's pro career took him from Ronan to 13 states and seven foreign nations on three continents.

“I’ve had a good life, as far as boxing is concerned, winning two world titles, losing world titles, seeing the world,” Camel said in 2015. “Some things people only dream about having, I did it. I’ve been there. I’ve been to the top of the mountain. But I feel there’s still something out there that I’ve got to have, and I don’t know what it is.” 

He is the subject of a biography released in December 2014, titled 'Warrior in the Ring' by Brian D'Ambrosio. The book was nominated for the High Plains Book Award and several other awards. "Boxer Marvin Camel’s life story and "Warrior in the Ring" are the stuff Hollywood movies are made of," said Big Sky Journal.

Born on the Flathead Reservation to a Native American mother and African American father, Camel's physical talents became obvious early in his life — and point to a path that could take him away from the poverty and isolation and racism that shape his childhood. D’Ambrosio looks at Camel's early life, the departure of his father, and the place the Camel children had as mixed-race residents on the reservation. He examines the constructs of identity and takes them as a starting point for his story, built from years of interviews with Camel, his friends and family, and members of the boxing community.

Twice crowned world champion in the cruiserweight division, Camel proudly appeared in his eagle-feather headdress to represent his state and his mother's people when he boxed. D’Ambrosio makes the point that Camel's Montana heritage influenced his story — and perhaps his tenacity — as much as anything else. In reflecting on his career and marveling at what takes a young boy from Montana and makes him a world champion, Camel said of himself, “The hills and fresh air of Montana made Marvin Camel.”

But Camel's story isn't just a feel-good, “boy from a small state and a rough background makes good” tale. The trajectory of Camel's career brought him into contact with some of the greatest names in the sport — and with some of the biggest conmen and villains trying to make money off the drama and danger. D’Ambrosio doesn't flinch away from the ugliness of life on the reservation as a mixed blood, the brutality of life in the boxing ring, or disillusionment about life after a career has slipped away. Nor does the story end with regret. Camel now lives with his second wife in Florida where he works in landscaping. But he will live on forever in the lore and history of Montana.

In December 2014, D'Ambrosio and Camel attended the 52nd Annual World Boxing Convention.

Honors
In 2006 at the World Boxing Council's 44th annual convention WBC President José Sulaimán awarded Camel honorary champion status.

Professional boxing record

See also 
List of cruiserweight boxing champions

References

External links 

Marvin Camel - Montana Magazine
Marvin Camel - CBZ Profile

1951 births
Living people
20th-century Native Americans
Confederated Salish and Kootenai Tribes
Native American boxers
American male boxers
Boxers from Montana
People from Ronan, Montana
Light-heavyweight boxers
World cruiserweight boxing champions
World Boxing Council champions
International Boxing Federation champions